The Strange Calls is an Australian television comedy series based on a short film with the same title, which had been produced by Daley Pearson and released in 2011. The series, broadcast in 2012, follows the adventures of Toby Banks, a young and recently disgraced police constable transferred from the city to a small town, and his elderly companion, Gregor, who every night receive strange calls from townspeople.

Production
The six-part series was created, written and directed by Daley Pearson, and was produced by Tracey Robertson, Nathan Mayfield and Leigh McGrath. Filming took place over four weeks in Coolum and Brisbane. The series was first screened on ABC2 in October and November 2012.

Cast
 Barry Crocker as Gregor
 Toby Truslove as Officer Toby Banks
 Patrick Brammall as Sergeant Neil Lloyd
 Katherine Hicks as Kath

Episodes
(Episode information retrieved from Australian Television Information Archive).

References

External links
The Strange Calls (official website) ABC.net.au

2012 Australian television series debuts
Australian Broadcasting Corporation original programming
Australian comedy television series